Hugh Maxton (born 1947), alias W. J. McCormack, is an Irish poet and academic. As a lecturer at the University of Leeds in Yorkshire, he focused on 19th- and 20th-century Irish literature. In addition to co-translating poetry from Hungarian and German, he has produced several volumes of poetry of his own, the most recent being Same Bridge Perhaps (Duras Press, 2013).

References

External links
 "Hugh Maxton", Current members — Aosdána.
 https://web.archive.org/web/20091004164439/http://www.irishwriters-online.com/hughmaxton.html

1947 births
Irish poets
People from County Wicklow
People from County Monaghan
Living people
Academics of the University of Leeds
Hungarian–English translators
German–English translators